Kantela is a village in Porbandar district of Gujarat, India. As of 2011, its population was 1,289, in 259 households.

To the north of the village is a water reservoir known as the Revati Kund, along with the Revateshwar Mahadev temple, said to have been founded by one Raja Revat. An inscription here, dated to samvat 1320 (1264 CE), describes the repair of the Revati Kund by one Samat Singh, who was viceroy of Saurashtra and, later, minister of Arjundev Vaghela.

Acharya Valabhji Haridat derived the name "Kantela" from kānt, "husband", and vela, "wave", due to the above inscription containing a passage translated as "Here, in the seat of her glory, did Revati sport with her husband in the woods on the seashore."

Its population in 1872 was 302, and in 1881 it was 373. It was described as economically very poor at the time.

References 

Villages in Porbandar district